The Canon de 75 modèle 1915 Saint-Chamond also known as the Canon de Tir Rapide 75 mm St Chamond or the Saint-Chamond-Mondragón was specified in the 1890s by Mexican General Manuel Mondragón, designed mostly by Colonel Émile Rimailho, and produced by the French arms manufacturer Saint-Chamond. It was widely used by different forces during the Mexican Revolution. It was also used in modified form to arm some of the French Saint-Chamond tanks deployed during the First World War.

Israel purchased a number of pieces from Mexico in 1948 and used them in the 1948 Arab–Israeli War. Because of its Mexican origin, the gun was known in Israel as Cucaracha. Three surviving pieces are on display in Israeli museums: two in the Israel Defense Forces History Museum in Tel Aviv, and one in Beyt ha-Gdudim museum in moshav Avihayil.

Notes

References 

 
Givati, Moshe - The Armor Craftsmen - The History of the 7100 Restoration and Maintenance Center, MoD 1998.
 

75 mm artillery
Artillery of Mexico
Forges et Aciéries de la Marine et d'Homécourt